Sarah Grunnet Stougaard (born 17 March 1998) is a Danish handball player who currently plays for Skanderborg Håndbold in the Danish Women's Handball League.

She also represented Denmark in the 2015 European Women's U-17 Handball Championship in Macedonia, leading to the trophy.

Achievements 
Youth World Championship:
Silver Medalist: 2016
European Youth Championship:
Winner: 2015
Junior European Championship:
Silver Medalist: 2017

References
 

1998 births
Living people
Danish female handball players